Asghar Ali Changezi (born 3 March 1967) is a Pakistani boxer. He competed in the men's light heavyweight event at the 1992 Summer Olympics.

References

1967 births
Living people
Pakistani male boxers
Olympic boxers of Pakistan
Boxers at the 1992 Summer Olympics
Place of birth missing (living people)
Asian Games bronze medalists for Pakistan
Asian Games medalists in boxing
Boxers at the 1990 Asian Games
Boxers at the 1994 Asian Games
Medalists at the 1990 Asian Games
Light-heavyweight boxers
20th-century Pakistani people